Raymond George Keegan (27 June 1923 – 12 July 2004) was an Australian rules footballer who played with Collingwood in the Victorian Football League (VFL).

Notes

External links 

Profile on Collingwood Forever

1923 births
2004 deaths
Australian rules footballers from Victoria (Australia)
Collingwood Football Club players
Prahran Football Club players